Korzhovka-Golubovka is a rural locality (a selo) and the administrative center of Korzhovogolubovskoye Rural Settlement, Klintsovsky District, Bryansk Oblast, Russia. The population was 2,266 as of 2010. There are 33 streets.

Geography 
Korzhovka-Golubovka is located 9 km east of Klintsy (the district's administrative centre) by road. Rassvet is the nearest rural locality.

References 

Rural localities in Klintsovsky District
Surazhsky Uyezd